Jean-Paul Delfino (born 1 August 1964 in Aix-en-Provence) is a French writer and screenwriter.

Bibliography 
Literature

 1999: L’Ile aux Femmes,  Noir
 2000: Tu touches pas à Marseille, Métailié Noir
 2000: La Faction, Atout Éditions
 2001: De l'eau dans le grisou, Métailié Noir
 2001: Chair de Lune, Métailié Grand Format
 2002: Embrouilles au Vélodrome, Métailié Noir
 2002: Droit aux brutes, ADCAN-Vivendi Diffusion,
 2006: Dans l’ombre du Condor, Métailié Hors collection
 2007: Samba triste, Métailié Hors collection
 2009: Zumbi, 
 2011: Pour tout l'or du Brésil, Le Passage
 2012: Pour l'amour de Rio, Le Passage
 2013: Brasil, Le Passage
 2014: Saudade, Le Passage
 2015: 12, rue Carioca , Le Passage
 2016: Les Pêcheurs d'étoiles, Le Passage

Collective

 2002: Bleu, blanc, sang, éditions Fleuve Noir
 2001: La fiesta dessoude, L’écailler du Sud
 2003: Meurtres sur un plateau, L’écailler du Sud
 2003: Le tacle et la plume, L’écailler du Sud
 2005: Saudade, with Cédric Fabre and Gilles Del Pappas, CLC
 2006:Va y avoir du sport !, Gallimard Jeunesse

Scripts and dialogues

 United Passions, by Frédéric Auburtin (Sélection officielle du Festival de Cannes 2014)

Documents

 1988: Brasil Bossa Nova, Edisud, Grand Prix du Label France Brésil – Foreword by Georges Moustaki
 1998: Brasil : a musica, 1st anthology of Brazilian folk music in Europe, Parenthèses
 2014: Couleurs Brasil, 40 chronicles on popular Brazilian music, Le Passage, co-edition with Radio France

Youth

 2001: Plus fort que les montagnes, Éditions L'Envol
 2002: Gaïa, le peuple des Horucks, et tout ce qu’il advint…, Éditions L'Envol
 2003: L’incroyable histoire de Momo-le-Mérou, Éditions L’Envol
 2004: Mais où est passée Princesse Lulu ?, CLC Éditions
 2006: Balduino, fils du Brésil, Éditions Pif Gadget

Radioplays

 2001: Le Triangle d'or, Radio France
 2001: Enfants, les nouveaux esclaves du football, Radio France
 2001: La mort après la vie, Radio France
 2002: Des cadavres en cascade, Radio France
 2002: De si gentils petits chats…, Radio France
 2003: Le Fossoyeur des espérances, Radio France
 2003: Bon appétit !, Radio France
 2004: Un dernier, pour la route…, Radio France
 2014: Couleurs Brasil, Radio France

External links 

 Jean-Paul Delfino on Babelio
 Jean-Paul Delfino: Saudade & United Passions on Impactmagazine
 Jean-Paul Delfino: J'aime le Brésil passionnément, comme une femme on Le Petit Journal
 Jean-Paul Delfino on Le Figaro.scope
 Les sagas brésiliennes de J.P. Delfino on Invitation au Brésil
 3 minutes avec Jean-Paul Delfino auteur de Couleurs Brasil on France Bleu
 Vidéo sur Mativi-provence.fr 
 Jean-Paul Delfino - 12, rue Carioca on YouTube

20th-century French non-fiction writers
21st-century French non-fiction writers
French children's writers
writers from Aix-en-Provence
1964 births
Living people